The 2016–17 GMHL season is the eleventh season of the Greater Metro Junior A Hockey League (GMHL). The teams of the GMHL played 42-game schedules.

In February 2017, the top teams of the league play for the Russell Cup, the playoff championship of the GMHL. Since the GMHL is independent from Hockey Canada and the Canadian Junior Hockey League, this is where the GMHL's season ends.

League changes 
Once all the membership changes were completed and the games were scheduled there were 28 teams. The league realigned then from three divisions to two 14-team North and South Divisions. By the start of the Russell Cup playoffs, there were 21 teams with 10 teams in the North Division and 11 teams in the South Division.

Expansion
 Expansion granted to Tillsonburg Hurricanes.
 Expansion granted to Lincoln Mavericks of Lincoln, Ontario.

Relocation or renamed
 Alliston Coyotes rebranded as New Tecumseth Civics after ownership change.
 Colbourne Chiefs rebranded as Northumberland Stars after ownership change.
 Grey Highlands Bravehearts relocated to Wiarton, Ontario as the Wiarton Rock.
 Shelburne Sharks re-brand as Shelburne Stars.
 Sturgeon Falls Lumberjacks returned to league. The team changed ownership and re-branded as the West Nipissing Lynx.

Folded
 During the previous season, the Brantford Steelfighters folded and was removed from the league schedule on November 5, 2015. The Steelfighters had their membership revoked at the end of the season.
 In March 2016, the league announced Bobcaygeon Storm, Coldwater Falcons, Grey County Grizzlies, and Haliburton Wolves were no longer league members.
 Shelburne Stars folded prior to the start of the season.
 Toronto Blue Ice Jets were removed from the schedule in the first week of the season.
 Bracebridge Blues were removed from the schedule after playing five games and forfeiting the sixth.
 Komoka Dragons folded on October 21 after playing 12 games.
 First year team, the Lincoln Mavericks, withdrew from the league on November 21.
 The Wiarton Rock folded mid-season on December 14.
 Orangeville Ice Crushers suspended operations in January. Three of the team's owners had been arrested for drug distribution in November 2016 and were suspended by the league. The league transferred control to another shareholder who ceased operations of the team after two months.

On hiatus
 The Norfolk Vikings chose to sit out the 2016–17 season.

Standings 
Note: GP = Games played; W = Wins; L = Losses; T = Tie; OTL = Overtime losses; GF = Goals for; GA = Goals against; PTS = Points; x = clinched playoff berth; q = relegated to qualifier round; y = clinched division title; z = clinched league title

Teams listed on the official league website.

Standings listed on official league website.

Teams in gray folded midseason.

2017 Russell Cup playoffs

8th Place Qualifiers
North Division

South Division

Playoff results are listed on the official league website.

Scoring leaders 
Note: GP = Games played; G = Goals; A = Assists; Pts = Points; PIM = Penalty minutes

Leading goaltenders 
Note: GP = Games played; Mins = Minutes played; W = Wins; L = Losses: OTL = Overtime losses; SL = Shootout losses; GA = Goals Allowed; SO = Shutouts; GAA = Goals against average

Awards
Top Scorer: Carl Lyden (South Muskoka Shield)
Most Valuable Player: North — Stepan Timofeyev (Bradford Rattlers); South — Manny Manns (Niagara Whalers)
Rookie of the Year: North — Zach Lefebvre (Temiscaming Titans); South — Noah Battaglia (Toronto Predators)
Top Forward: North — Carl Lyden (South Muskoka Shield); South — Regan Yew (London Lakers)
Top Defenceman: North — Zakk Bekolay (Bradford Bulls); South — Zach Wright (Oshawa Riverkings)
Top Goaltender: North — TJ Sherwood (New Tecumseth Civics); South — Ryan Purcell (St. George Ravens)
Top Defensive Forward: North — Carmine Vietri (New Tecumseth Civics); South — Blake Naida (Kingsville Kings)
Most Sportsmanlike Player: North — Tom Stanislavski (Almaguin Spartans); South — Brody Dyck (Northumberland Stars)
Most Heart: North — Connor Annett - (Knights of Meaford); South — Ryan Dasilva (Tottenham Steam)
Top Coach: North — Doug Raymond (Parry Sound Islanders); South — Ryan Ramsay (North York Renegades)

See also 
 2016 in ice hockey
 2017 in ice hockey

References

External links 
 Official website of the Greater Metro Junior A Hockey League

GMHL
Greater Metro Junior A Hockey League seasons